Ellis County Courthouse may refer to:

Ellis County Courthouse (Kansas)
Ellis County Courthouse (Oklahoma)
Ellis County Courthouse (Texas), designed by James Riely Gordon